General elections were held in Sierra Leone Colony and Protectorate in November 1951.

Electoral system
The 1947 constitution expanded the Legislative Council to 35 members, of which seven were government officials, seven were appointed Europeans, fourteen were Africans indirectly elected from the Protectorate (ten from District Councils and two from the Protectorate Assembly) and seven were Africans directly elected from the Colony. Around 5,000 people were registered to vote.

Campaign
Only five of the seven directly-elected constituencies were contested, with candidates running unopposed in two of the rural constituencies.

Results
The National Council (NCSL) won three of the seven elected seats, and the Sierra Leone People's Party (SLPP) two. However, the SLPP gained the support of the indirectly elected protectorate representatives. 

A total of 3,276 votes were cast; 2,438 in the three Freetown constituencies and 838 (550 and 288) in the two contested rural constituencies.

Elected members

Aftermath
The SLPP's Milton Margai was appointed Chief Minister in 1953.

References

Elections in Sierra Leone
Sierra Leone
1951 in Sierra Leone
Election and referendum articles with incomplete results